The Cross-Straits Common Market Foundation is an organization in Taiwan dealing with cross-strait trading. The office is located at Tunnan Tower, Da'an District, Taipei.

History
The organization was founded on 26 March 2001.

Objectives
 A new position for both sides in the emerging global economy
 Remove controversial political and economic impasses
 Role played by both sides in the new century

See also
 Cross-Strait relations

References

External links
  

2001 establishments in Taiwan
Cross-Strait relations
Organizations based in Taipei
Organizations established in 2001